Tracy, Tracey, or Tracie may refer to:

People and fictional characters 
 Tracy (name), including a list of people and fictional characters with the given name or surname, also encompassing spelling variations

Places

United States 
 Tracy, California
 Tracy Municipal Airport (California), airport owned by the City of Tracy
 Deuel Vocational Institution, a California state prison sometimes referred to as "Tracy"
 Tracy station, a train station in southern Tracy, California
 Tracy, a neighborhood in Wallingford, Connecticut
 Tracy, Illinois
 Tracy, Indiana
 Tracy, Iowa
 Tracy, Kentucky
 Tracy, Minnesota
 Tracy, Missouri
 Tracy, Montana
 Tracy, New Jersey
 Tracy, Oklahoma
 Tracy City, Tennessee

Elsewhere 
 Tracy, New Brunswick, Canada
 Tracy Glacier (Greenland)

Music 
 Tracie (singer) (Tracie Young, born 1965), British singer
 Tracie (album), a 1999 album by Tracie Spencer
 "Tracy" (The Cuff Links song), by The Cuff Links on their first album Tracy in 1969
 "Tracy" (Mogwai song), by Scottish group Mogwai from their 1997 debut, Mogwai Young Team
 "Tracy", a song, by DJ Ironik from his album No Point in Wasting Tears
 "Tracie" (song), by the British band Level 42

Power stations 
 Frank A. Tracy Generating Station, a 1,021-MW gas-fired thermal power station in Nevada
 Tracy Thermal Generating Station, a retired 660-MW heavy fuel oil-fueled thermal power station in Quebec

Other uses 
 Tracey (film), a 2018 Hong Kong film
 Tracy (sheep), a transgenically modified sheep
 Cyclone Tracy, 25 December 1974, Northern Australia